Bartow is a surname, and it has also been used as a given name. Notable people with the name include:

Surname
 Edward Bartow (1870–1958), American chemist
 Francis S. Bartow (1816–1861), American politician and Confederate officer in the American Civil War
 Gene Bartow (1930–2012), American basketball coach
 Murry Bartow (born 1961), American basketball coach and son of Gene
 Rick Bartow (1946–2016), Native American artist

Given name
 Bartow Sumter Weeks (1861–1922), New York Supreme Court Justice
 Bartow White (1776–1862), American physician and politician

See also
Barlow (surname)
Barlowe, surname
Barstow (surname)